Árni Þórarinsson is an Icelandic writer born in Reykjavík on 1 August 1950. He received his B.A. in 1973 from the University of East Anglia in Norwich, England.

He started out as a journalist and has worked in print, radio, and television. In 1989 he was on the board of the Reykjavik Film festival. His first novel was in that same year and was a crime novel. He has written several other crime novels some of which may become films.

Bibliography

Einar crime novel series
Nóttin hefur þúsund augu (1998)
Hvíta kanínan (2000)
Blátt tungl (2001)
Tími nornarinnar (2005) (English translation by Anna Yates: Season of the Witch, 2012)
Dauði trúðsins (2007)
Sjöundi sonurinn (2008) 
Morgunengill (2010)
Ár kattarins (2012)
Glæpurinn - Ástarsaga (2013)
13 dagar (2016) (eng.: 13 Days)

See also 

 Leyndardómar Reykjavíkur 2000 (multi-author crime novel with one chapter by Árni)
 List of Icelandic writers
 Icelandic literature

References

External links
Iceland literature site

Living people
1950 births
Alumni of the University of East Anglia

Arni Torarinsson
Arni Torarinsson
Arni Torarinsson